The Scene Stealer Festival is an awards ceremony recognizing actors for screen presence and acting ability. Each year, jury members select 22 scene stealers among all the actors who were actively engaged in films and dramas based on online big data collected and analyzed from the prior two years. The first festival was held at Seogwipo Arts Center in Jeju Island, Jeju Province, on September 2, 2015. For the second festival, the jury added awards for a director as well as an achievement award to honor a veteran actor or actress. Two of the 22 awards were also reserved for a young actor and actress chosen by jury members. The event took place at the Jangchung Arena near Dongguk University in the Jung District of Seoul on July 19, 2016. 3rd scene stealer festival was hosted virtually in a studio near Gangnam in December 7th, 2021 after a long break because of the covid outbreak, evaluating performances of actors from 2019 to 2021.

Categories
22 Scene Stealers of the Year 
Achievement Award (in 2016)
Director Award (in 2016)
Male and Female Rookie of the Year (in 2016)
no categories existed for 2021, but 19 scene stealers were announced along with a special tribute to O yeong su.

Awards 
A number of awards are handed out each year, including:

22 Scene Stealers of the Year

Achievement Award

Rookie Scene Stealers of the Year

Director Award

References

External links 

Awards established in 2015
2015 establishments in South Korea
Annual events in South Korea